A confiture is any fruit jam, marmalade, paste, sweetmeat, or fruit stewed in thick syrup. Confit, the root of the word, comes from the French word confire which means literally "preserved"; a confit being any type of food that is cooked slowly over a long period of time as a method of preservation.

See also

Fruit preserves – fruits combined with sugar readied in a manner appropriate for long-term storage
Konfyt – South African jam
spoon sweets - Fruits candied in a syrupy glaze, offered in Greece as a gesture of hospitality.
varenye - Russian preserves made with whole fruits or large fruit pieces.
slatko - A whole-fruit preserve in Eastern European cuisine. 
 List of spreads

References

Condiments
Culinary terminology
Food ingredients
Food preservation
French cuisine
Spreads (food)
Preserved fruit